Ammar Rihawi (born on 20 June 1975 in Aleppo, Syria) is a retired Syrian international football midfielder, and current coach

International career
Rihawi was a part of the Syrian U-19 team that won the AFC U-19 Championship 1994 in Indonesia and he was a part of the Syrian U-20 team at the FIFA U-20 World Cup 1995 in Qatar. In addition, he competed with the national team at the AFC Asian Cup 1996 in the UAE, and played again for Syria at the FIFA World Cup qualification 1998.

Personal life
Rihawi has four children: Shahd, Wagd, Laith and Tasneem.

Managerial statistics

References

1975 births
Living people
People from Aleppo
Sportspeople from Aleppo
Syrian footballers
Association football midfielders
Syria international footballers
Al-Ittihad Aleppo players
Al-Nasr SC (Kuwait) players
Syrian expatriate footballers
Expatriate footballers in Kuwait
Syrian expatriate sportspeople in Kuwait
Expatriate footballers in Lebanon
Syrian expatriate sportspeople in Lebanon
Lebanese Premier League players
Homenetmen Beirut footballers
1996 AFC Asian Cup players
Al-Ittihad Kalba SC players
UAE Pro League players
Syrian Premier League players
Kuwait Premier League players